The EF 80–200mm lens is a discontinued telephoto zoom lens made by Canon. The lens has an EF lens mount that fits the EOS line of cameras.

Versions
There are four versions:

2.8L lens (informally known as the "Magic Drainpipe")
4.5–5.6 lens
4.5–5.6 USM
4.5–5.6 II

Canon released the 2.8L version in September 1989, retailing it for about US$1,320. Canon replaced it with the 70–200mm 2.8L in 1995.

Table

References

External links

Canon EF lenses
Canon L-Series lenses